Raphaël Aubert (born 1953 in Lausanne, Switzerland) is a Swiss writer and essayist.

Biography

Early life and education
Raphaël Aubert was brought up in a family of artists. He studied in the Faculty of Arts and Theology at University of Lausanne and in Paris.

Career
His first book Proche de l’argile ou la Remontée, a collection of poems, was published in 1975. He has since then published ten books including short stories and some novels, especially La bataille de San Romano (The Battle of San Romano), the action of which starts at the Louvre and questions the mysteries of Paolo Uccello's famous painting, and La Terrasse des éléphants (Elephants's terrace), novel of the encounter and destiny during the last years of the Vietnam's war.

As a journalist for Radio Télévision Suisse, he has travelled to Russia and various eastern countries, the Near East, the United States and Asia.

His essays include studies of André Malraux and Salman Rushdie, the latter titled L’affaire Rushdie (The Rushdie Affair), which garnered interest as it was the first study in French on the Indo-British author. In Le Paradoxe Balthus (The Balthus Paradox), he develops an iconoclastic argument based on Balthus’s famously controversial painting, La Leçon de guitare (The Guitar Lesson).

Aubert contributes to various reviews in Switzerland and in France, among which art press and Le Passe Muraille. He is one of the Swiss correspondents of the "Research and Information Circle André Malraux" and he contributed to the André Malraux Dictionary (Paris, CNRS Editions, 2011 ).

In 2014, he received the State of Vaud Literature Prize and in 2015, he was knighted in Arts and Letters by the French Ministry of Culture and Communication.

Selected works
L'Absolu et la métamorphose, Genève, Labor et Fides, 1985
L'Affaire Rushdie, Paris, Le Cerf, 1990
La Bataille de San Romano, Vevey, L'Aire bleue, 2006
Malraux ou la Lutte avec l'ange, Genève, Labor et Fides, 2001
Le Paradoxe Balthus, Paris, La Différence, 2005
Dieu est-il violent? Paris, Bayard, 2008
La Terrasse des éléphants Vevey, L'Aire, 2009; L'Aire bleue, 2011, 2015
Chronique des treize lunes. Journal 2008, Vevey, L'Aire, 2009
Malraux & Picasso Une relation manquée, Paris/Gollion, Infolio, 2013
Cet envers du temps. Journal 2013, Vevey, L'Aire, 2014
Le Voyage à Paris. Un carnet de Pierre Aubert, Lausanne, art&fiction, 2017
Balthus L'Antimoderne, Paris/Gollion, Infolio, 2019

References

Notes

Bibliography
 Francillon, Roger, ed (1999). Histoire de la littérature en Suisse romande, Vol. IV, Lausanne, Payot

External links 
 Lausanne Library Biographical notice
 La Différence (French publisher) Author file
 Malraux on the web Literary reference Site

1953 births
Living people
People from Lausanne
Swiss journalists
Swiss male novelists
Swiss writers in French
Swiss male poets
20th-century Swiss poets
20th-century male writers
20th-century Swiss novelists
21st-century Swiss poets
21st-century Swiss novelists
21st-century male writers